Silvascincus tryoni, the Border Ranges blue-spectacled skink or forest skink, is a species of lizard in the family Scincidae. It is endemic to the McPherson Range bordering New South Wales and Queensland, Australia.

Etymology
The specific name, tryoni, is in honor of English scientist Henry Tryon (1856–1943).

Description
It has well-defined, dark transverse dorsal markings on light to mid-brown background.

Reproduction
Silvascincus tryoni is viviparous.

Habitat and conservation
Specimens have been found on logs and rocks, under decayed logs, and sunning at the base of a hollow giant stinging tree Dendrocnide excelsa. When disturbed, they seek refuge under rocks and logs.

Silvascincus tryoni  might be at least locally common. Its range is small but coincides, perhaps entirely, with protected areas, including Lamington and Border Ranges National Parks. It is unlikely to be facing any major threats.

References

Silvascincus
Skinks of Australia
Reptiles of New South Wales
Reptiles of Queensland
Endemic fauna of Australia
Reptiles described in 1918
Taxa named by Albert Heber Longman
Taxobox binomials not recognized by IUCN